Outnumbered is a British sitcom about the Brockman family, starring Hugh Dennis as the father, Claire Skinner as the mother and their three children played by Tyger Drew-Honey, Daniel Roche and Ramona Marquez.

There were five series, which aired on BBC One from 2007 to 2014. A Christmas special aired on 26 December 2016. More specials are planned after the success of the 2016 Christmas special.

Produced by Hat Trick Productions, Outnumbered was written, directed and produced by Andy Hamilton and Guy Jenkin, although parts of the show are semi-improvised. The adult actors learn the scripts, while the children are given last-minute instructions by the writers instead.

The programme has received critical acclaim for its semi-improvisational scripting and realistic portrayal of children and family life. Ratings have been average for its time slot, but the series has won a number of awards from the Comedy.co.uk awards, the Royal Television Society, the British Comedy Awards and the Broadcasting Press Guild. Plans for an American adaptation were announced in February 2009, but  this has not materialised. The original series began airing in the US on BBC America on 30 July 2011, as well as airing on PBS stations.

Plot

Outnumbered is centred on the Brockmans, a middle-class family living in Chiswick, whose two parents are "outnumbered" by their three somewhat unruly children. The father, Pete (Hugh Dennis), is a history teacher at a dysfunctional inner city school and the mother, Sue (Claire Skinner), is a part-time personal assistant and is four years younger than Pete. The three children are: Jake (Tyger Drew-Honey), the straight man of the family, whose teenage sarcasm and obsession with girls worries his mother, Ben (Daniel Roche), who is hyperactive, a pathological liar, does unusual things (experimenting or as Pete puts it, "roasting insects"), and is always coming up with hypothetical questions like "who would win in a fight between...", and Karen (Ramona Marquez), who asks too many questions, frequently imitates a lot of what she sees on television (reenacting reality shows with her toys) and criticises nearly everything.

Other regular characters include Sue's new age sister, Angela Morrison (Samantha Bond), and their elderly father Frank (David Ryall), referred to as "Grandad", who is in the early stages of dementia. He is a silent and deceased character in the 2016 special. The writers also use the popular sitcom device of the unseen character in the form of Veronica, Sue's unreasonably demanding boss in series one. In series two, the device is used again, but in the form of Sue's new boss Tyson, who is revealed to be a conman who absconds in the final episode of the series. Series three introduces Rosalind Ayres as Pete's mum Sandra, referred to as "Gran", on online-gambling addict with a growing hatred for Pete's father, from whom she has separated, though has not divorced as she "couldn't face all the paperwork".

Other new characters in Series 3 include Kelly (Anna Skellern), a psychology student on whom Jake has a crush, Angela's new husband Brick (Douglas Hodge), who is an American therapist (later revealed to be abusive towards his children, especially 15-year-old Misty), and his daughter Taylor Jean, who wants to live with her mum. Also introduced is a campaigner against council plans to place speed bumps on the road (Alex MacQueen) who pesters the family.

By series 5, the Brockman children have changed considerably. Jake has developed a penchant for engaging with a suspect crowd of friends, and a general teenage cockiness. Ben has doubled in size and strength, but not his maturity. And the pre-teen Karen has become moody, sullen and developed a superiority complex as she heads towards a prestigious secondary school.

Production

Outnumbered was the first collaboration between Hamilton and Jenkin since Drop the Dead Donkey ended in 1998. It was commissioned by BBC controller Lucy Lumsden. The executive producer is Jon Rolph. The 20-minute pilot was given to Lumsden, who then commissioned six episodes. The show is set in Chiswick, West London, and shot on location in Wandsworth. The house used for external shots is in Dempster Road. During the second series, the family receive a final demand for council tax from the fictional "Limebridge Council", sent to the fictional address of 19 Keely Road, London, W4 2CF.

The writers use improvisation in order to achieve convincing performances from the child actors. Jenkin added: You rarely get the feeling that children in sitcoms are real. They tend to be the same type of character – the smartarse who says adult things – and they are rooted to the spot, staring at the camera, because they've been told to stand in one place and say the lines. We decided to attempt to do something that hadn't been tried before, bounced some ideas around and we got very keen on this idea of involving improvisation very quickly. The child performers were cast based on how their responses reflected the outlines of the characters they would be playing. Hamilton said in an interview: "I saw about 30 [children], then we whittled it down to the perfect three. Ramona [Marquez]...was in the same class as Guy's twin sons. His wife said to him: 'There's a girl who's got something - you should meet her.'"

The fourth series began on 2 September 2011 at 9.00 pm on BBC One. After the series had aired, Tyger Drew-Honey suggested that there would be no fifth series because he and the other child actors were growing out of their roles. BBC Television's Head of Communications, Sam Hodges, reassured fans of the series that "contrary to reports, talks are already under way regarding a new series".

The fifth and final series was confirmed by BBC and began to air Wednesday 29 January 2014. The series comprised six episodes.

In 2015, Tyger Drew-Honey hinted that the series could return for a Christmas special in 2016. This was officially confirmed by co-creator Andy Hamilton in September 2016.

Episodes

Cast and characters

Main
 Claire Skinner as Susan “Sue” Brockman (née Morrison)
 Hugh Dennis as Peter “Pete” Brockman
 Tyger Drew-Honey as Jake Brockman
 Daniel Roche as Ben Brockman
 Ramona Marquez as Karen Brockman

Recurring
 Samantha Bond as Angela Morrison
 David Ryall as Frank “Grandad” Morrison
 Hattie Morahan as Jane
 Lorraine Pilkington as Barbara
 Rosalind Ayres as Sandra “Gran” Brockman 
 Anna Skellern as Kelly
 David Troughton as Mr. Hunslet

Guest appearances

 Jacob Anderson
 Michele Austin
 Mark Benton
 Sanjeev Bhaskar
 Silas Carson
 Lolita Chakrabarti
 Louisa Connolly-Burnham
 Jake D'Arcy
 Lucinda Dryzek
 Daisy Edgar-Jones
 Rebecca Front
 Chris Geere
 Stella Gonet
 Daisy Haggard
 Mark Heap
 Julia Hills
 Douglas Hodge
 Katherine Jakeways
 Miles Jupp
 Sam Kelly
 Caroline Langrishe
 Lee Mack
 Alex Macqueen
 Ruth Madeley
 Felicity Montagu
 Cliff Parisi
 Nigel Pegram
 Lucy Porter
 Olivia Poulet
 Vineeta Rishi
 Abdul Salis
 John Sessions
 Harry Shearer
 Mark Spalding
 Sophie Stanton
 Rhashan Stone
 Ellen Thomas
 Pip Torrens
 Martin Trenaman
 Eros Vlahos
 Katy Wix
 Sarah Woodward
 Matilda Ziegler

Ages of children

Reception

Critical reception
The show initially received a mixed reception, though after the second series reviews gradually shifted towards a fairly positive tone. The Daily Mirror found the mundane settings to be similar to the American sitcom Seinfeld, saying: compared to the ridiculous carry-on of My Family, it's much more low-key and realistic. In fact it's so low-key, nothing actually happens, which could well be a nod to Seinfeld – the touchstone of all great sitcoms. The getting ready for school chaos is like Supernanny: The Movie only with nicer children. It's also taken a leaf out of Curb Your Enthusiasm's book with large chunks of improvisation – although the strongest language you'll find here is "ponk".

Kevin Maher of The Times dismissed the programme, saying it was not funny or dramatic enough. He wrote: Outnumbered was at its most meretricious. For every exchange between adult and child was hijacked by a crass sitcommy need for sotto voce punchlines and knowing winks to the wings. A protracted scene in which 45-year-old dad (Hugh Dennis) was unable to wrestle a live power drill from the hands of 7-year-old son Ben (Daniel Roche), and instead had to, ho-ho, pay him £5 for the privilege, was emblematic of the show's dubious capacity for fake pay-offs.

Rod Liddle, writing in The Sunday Times, praised the show, although he was somewhat surprised: "An exquisitely middle-class, middle-aged domestic situation comedy set in West London – and starring one of those bloody stand-up comics who now festoons every network, it really should be hated before it is even seen. Start liking this sort of programme and you are an ace away from enjoying Terry and June and having a house that smells faintly of weak tea, Murray Mints and urine. So, maybe it's just me, but Outnumbered is very funny indeed: despite its current bout of self-flagellation, the BBC still knows how to make people laugh. Comedy may be the very last thing the corporation does well."

James Walton wrote in The Daily Telegraph that the domestic setting and more mundane storylines were a virtue, saying, "All of this feels both carefully observed and suspiciously heartfelt. More unusually, it's not contrived. Outnumbered sticks firmly with the mundane, yet manages to be funny about it. It doesn't avoid the sheer dullness involved in family life either – but, happily, depicts it with a winning mixture of exasperation and affection." He did, however, criticise the scheduling of the programme saying, "Despite the very specific London setting, the series (shown in two batches of three, this week and next) will surely appeal to the parents of young children everywhere. As long, that is, as they're not asleep by 10.35pm."

In 2008 review in The Times, Bryan Appleyard described Outnumbered as "the best British sitcom in years and among the best ever".

Ratings
The first episode received 4.1 million viewers (25.5% of the audience share) when it began and finished with 2.8 million (19.5%) at the end, which is larger than the average 2.2 million (14%) normally attracted by television shows in its particular time slot. The audience for the second episode fell by half a million viewers, while still being the highest ranking show in its time slot, with 18% of the audience share. However, it maintained a constant audience throughout the first series, with the fourth episode attracting 2.7 million viewers (20% audience share).

Episode ratings from BARB.

Series 1

Series 2

Series 3

Series 4

Series 5

Specials

Awards
Outnumbered was nominated for the 2008 "Broadcast Award" for "Best Comedy Programme", but lost the award to The Thick of It.

The show was given the "British Comedy Guide Editors' Award" in The Comedy.co.uk Awards 2007 and the "Best Returning British TV Sitcom" in The Comedy.co.uk Awards 2008, beating Peep Show by six votes.

In 2009, it won the Royal Television Society Award for "Scripted Comedy", and two Broadcasting Press Guild Awards in the same year: "Best Comedy/Entertainment" and the "Writer's Award". Outnumbered also won three awards at the 2009 British Comedy Awards: Best Sitcom, Best British Comedy and Best Female Newcomer for Ramona Marquez.

The show has received four BAFTA TV Award nominations: Best Situation Comedy, the Audience Award, and Best Comedy Performance for Claire Skinner in 2009; and Best Male Performance in a Comedy Role for Hugh Dennis in 2010.

At the National Television Awards in 2011, Outnumbered was nominated for Best Comedy but lost out to ITV's Benidorm. It was nominated again the following year and won.

DVD releases
All five series and the three Christmas specials are available on DVD. The first Comic Relief special is available on the Series 2 DVD, the first Sport Relief special is available on the Series 3 DVD and the second Comic Relief special is available on the Series 4 DVD. It has been said that the second Sport Relief special will either be available on the next Christmas Special DVD or the Series 5 DVD (if they will be filmed or if they have been filmed). The DVDs have been published by 2 Entertain.

References

External links

Review, Leicester Mercury

2007 British television series debuts
2016 British television series endings
2000s British comedy-drama television series
2000s British sitcoms
2010s British comedy-drama television series
2010s British sitcoms
BBC television sitcoms
British television series revived after cancellation
English-language television shows
Improvisational television series
Television series about dysfunctional families
Television series about marriage
Television series about siblings
Television series by Hat Trick Productions
Television shows set in London